Gadzhi Umarov (born 6 May 1985 in Buynaksk) is a Russian taekwondo practitioner. He competed in the +80 kg event at the 2012 Summer Olympics; he was eliminated by François Coulombe-Fortier in the preliminary round.

He is a graduate of the "Five Directions of the World" school in Dagestan, Russia.

References

1985 births
Living people
People from Buynaksk
Russian male taekwondo practitioners
Olympic taekwondo practitioners of Russia
Taekwondo practitioners at the 2012 Summer Olympics
Sportspeople from Dagestan
21st-century Russian people
20th-century Russian people